Power FM Bega Bay (call sign: 2EEE) is a commercial radio station available on the New South Wales south coast, covering the areas surrounding Bega, Batemans Bay, Narooma, Merimbula, Eden and Moruya.

The station broadcasts on two frequencies in order to reach the whole Bega license area- 102.5 FM, covering the Bega Valley local government area, and 104.3 FM, covering the Eurobodalla Shire.

Power FM has local announcers and a local news reader, providing local content 7 days a week. National News is on the hour, 6am to 6pm and provided from Sydney.

In November 2021, Power FM, along with other stations owned by Grant Broadcasters, were acquired by the Australian Radio Network. This deal will allow Grant's stations, including Power FM, to access ARN's iHeartRadio platform in regional areas. The deal was finalized on January 4, 2022.  It is expected Power FM will integrate with ARN's KIIS Network, but will retain its current name according to the press release from ARN.

Stations
102.5 Bega Valley Shire
104.3 Eurobodalla Shire

See also 
List of radio stations in Australia

References

External links 
 Power FM New South Wales South Coast

Radio stations in New South Wales
South Coast (New South Wales)
Radio stations established in 1997
Contemporary hit radio stations in Australia
Australian Radio Network